The Texas Chainsaw Massacre is a 2003 American slasher film directed by Marcus Nispel (in his feature directorial debut), written by Scott Kosar, and starring Jessica Biel, Jonathan Tucker, Erica Leerhsen, Mike Vogel, Eric Balfour, and R. Lee Ermey. Its plot follows a group of young adults traveling through rural Texas who encounter Leatherface and his murderous family. It is a remake of Tobe Hooper's 1974 film of the same name, and the fifth installment in The Texas Chainsaw Massacre franchise. Several crew members of the original film were involved with the project: Hooper and writer Kim Henkel served as co-producers, Daniel Pearl returned as cinematographer, and John Larroquette reprised his voice narration for the opening intertitles.

The film was released in the United States on October 17, 2003, received mostly negative reviews from critics, and grossed $107 million at the box office on a budget of $9.5 million. A prequel was released in 2006, titled The Texas Chainsaw Massacre: The Beginning. The Texas Chainsaw Massacre was the first film to be produced by Platinum Dunes, who would go on to produce remakes of several other 20th-century horror films.

Plot

On August 18, 1973, five young adults – Erin, her boyfriend Kemper, and their friends Morgan, Andy, and Pepper – are on their way to a Lynyrd Skynyrd concert after traveling to Mexico to purchase marijuana. While driving through Texas, they pick up a traumatised hitchhiker walking in the middle of the road. After they try to talk with her, she speaks incoherently about "a bad man", and pulls out a revolver and shoots herself in the mouth.

The group goes to a nearby gas station to contact the police, where a woman named Luda Mae tells them to meet Sheriff Hoyt at the mill. Instead, they find a young boy named Jedidiah, who says Hoyt is at home getting drunk. Erin and Kemper go through the woods to find his house, leaving Morgan, Andy, and Pepper at the mill with Jedidiah. They come across a plantation house, and Erin is allowed inside by an amputee named Monty to call for help. Kemper goes inside to look for Erin, and is hit in the head with a sledgehammer by Thomas Hewitt, also known as "Leatherface", who drags his body into the basement to butcher him.

Meanwhile, Hoyt arrives at the mill, and disposes of the hitchhiker's body. After Erin discovers that Kemper is missing, she and Andy go back to Monty's house, and Erin distracts him, while Andy searches for Kemper. When Monty realizes that Andy is inside, he summons Leatherface, who attacks him with a chainsaw. Andy tells Erin to save herself and Erin escapes and heads towards the woods, but Leatherface catches up to Andy and hacks off his left leg with the chainsaw. He then picks him up and carries him to the basement, where he brutally impales him on a meat hook and tortures him. Erin makes it back to the mill, but before she and the others can leave, Hoyt arrives. After finding marijuana on the dashboard, he orders Erin and Pepper to get out of the van, gives Morgan the gun he took from the hitchhiker, and tells him to reenact how she killed herself. Morgan attempts to shoot Hoyt, but the gun is unloaded. Hoyt handcuffs Morgan and drives him back to the Hewitt house, taking the van's key with him.

Back at the sinister house Andy awakens after passing out from the pain and in desperation tries to lift himself off the meat hook but leatherface has booby trapped the chains holding it up causing him to impale himself further. Erin and Pepper are tracked down by Leatherface, who is wearing Kemper's face as a mask, and when Pepper attempts to run, she is killed by Leatherface. Erin runs and hides in a nearby trailer, belonging to an obese middle-aged woman known as the Tea Lady, and a younger woman named Henrietta, who gives her tea that has been drugged. Erin discovers that they have kidnapped the hitchhiker's baby, but passes out before she can escape. Erin wakes up at the Hewitt house, surrounded by the entire family: Leatherface, his mother Luda Mae, Hoyt, Monty, and Jedidiah. Luda Mae explains to Erin that Leatherface was tormented his whole life, because of a skin disease that left his face disfigured, and she felt that no one cared for her family besides themselves.

Erin is taken to the basement, where she finds the remains of Leatherface's victims. She he finds Andy and kills him to end his suffering after failing to help him off the hook. Afterwards, she finds Morgan handcuffed in a bathtub. Jedidiah, who does not agree with his family's actions, leads them out of the house, and distracts Leatherface long enough for them to escape. Erin and Morgan find an abandoned shack in the woods, and barricade themselves inside. Leatherface breaks in and discovers Erin, but Morgan attacks Leatherface, who hangs him from a chandelier by his handcuffs, and cuts through his groin with the chainsaw. Erin escapes into the woods with Leatherface in tow. She finds a slaughterhouse and attacks Leatherface with a meat cleaver, severing his right arm.

Erin runs outside and flags down a trucker, whom she tries to convince to drive away from the Hewitt house, but he stops to find help at the gas station. Erin sees Luda Mae & Hoyt talk to the trucker while Henrietta watches the baby. But as Henrietta walks outside to give Luda Mae her raincoat, Erin sneaks the baby out of the eatery, and places her in the sheriff's car. Erin hot-wires the car and Hoyt tries to stop her, but she runs him over repeatedly until he is dead. Leatherface suddenly appears in the road and slashes the car with his chainsaw, but Erin escapes with the baby. Two days later, two officers investigating the Hewitt house are killed by Leatherface, and a narrator states that the case remains open.

Cast

 Jessica Biel as Erin 
 Jonathan Tucker as Morgan
 Erica Leerhsen as Pepper 
 Mike Vogel as Andy
 Eric Balfour as Kemper
 Andrew Bryniarski as Thomas Hewitt
 R. Lee Ermey as Sheriff Hoyt
 David Dorfman as Jedidiah
 Lauren German as Teenage Girl
 Terrence Evans as Old Monty
 Marietta Marich as Luda Mae
 Heather Kafka as Henrietta
 Kathy Lamkin as Tea Lady in Trailer
 Brad Leland as Big Rig Bob
 Mamie Meek as Clerk
 John Larroquette as Narrator

Production

Development
On December 5, 2001, Creature Corner.com reported that Michael Bay's newly created company Platinum Dunes (which was created in order to produce low-budget films), had set its focus on remaking The Texas Chain Saw Massacre. Early announcements on the site indicated that the story would be told in flashback with actress Marilyn Burns, who starred in the original film, reprising her role as an aged Sally Hardesty recounting the events in the film. It was later announced that the filmmakers had already purchased the rights to the original film.

Early in the film's production the original filmmakers Tobe Hooper and Kim Henkel would be writing a script for the film, but it was unknown at the time whether or not their script would be used. In June 2002, it was announced that Marcus Nispel would direct the film in his directorial debut.  Nispel said that he was initially against the idea of remaking the film, calling it "blasphemy" to his longtime director of photography, Daniel Pearl, who had shot the original film.  Pearl, however, encouraged Nispel to join the project, as he wanted to bookend his career with Chainsaw films.

It was later announced that Scott Kosar signed on as the film's screenwriter.
As in the original 1974 version, it is loosely inspired by the real-life crimes of Wisconsin serial killer Ed Gein. Gein's crimes had also inspired novels such as Psycho and The Silence of the Lambs, both of which were later adapted into subsequent films.

Writing
The screenplay was written by Scott Kosar, who went on to write the screenplays for The Machinist and Platinum Dunes' remake of The Amityville Horror.
The film was Kosar's first professional job as a screenwriter and later recalled feeling both thrilled and honored at the prospect of writing the screenplay for the remake. Kosar also realized early on that he was dealing with "one of the seminal works of the genre" and one that could not be bettered. When discussing with the film's producers, Kosar felt that the new film shouldn't try to compete with the original film, as he felt that it was made under different circumstances.
In earlier drafts Erin, the film's main character, was revealed to be nine months pregnant throughout the film but was removed from later drafts at producer Michael Bay's insistence.

Casting
Jessica Biel, who previously starred in the television series 7th Heaven, was cast as the main character Erin.

Actor Andrew Bryniarski, who starred in Bay's Pearl Harbor and stayed friends with him afterwards, personally met with producer Bay and asked him for the role of Leatherface. Another actor, named Brett Wagner, was cast for the role before Bryniarski, but, on the first day, the actor was hospitalized and fired for lying about his physical abilities. Without an actor for the film's main antagonist, the filmmakers called and asked if Bryniarski still wanted the role, which he accepted. To prepare for the role, Bryniarski ate a diet of brisket and white bread in order to get his weight to nearly 300 pounds. Bryniarski would later reprise his role as Leatherface in the film's prequel.

Filming
Nispel favored shooting the film in California, but Bay suggested Texas, where he had previously shot three times. Principal photography began in Austin in July 2002 and lasted 40 days. Nispel intentionally shot the film in a different style, using more traditionally narrative elements, as he did not want to make a shot-for-shot remake replicating the original film's documentary-like style. Cinematographer Pearl explained from an on-set interview: "People ask me, 'Is it going to be as gritty and grainy as the last one I did?' No. I did that. There's no point in making the exact same film with the exact same look."

The remake includes references to the previous film, including John Larroquette, who returns in his role as the film's narrator.

The weather during filming was very hot and humid. Bryniarski, who portrays Leatherface in the film, did all his own stunts and was forced to wear a "fat suit", which increased his near-300 lbs to 420 lbs. The suit also heated up quickly, so the actor had to ensure that he drank a lot of fluids before a shoot. Leatherface's mask was also a problem; the mask was made out of silicone and was difficult for the actor to breathe through. The crew had many prop chainsaws for actor Bryniarski to use, such as chainsaws that put out smoke, and live chainsaws.

Release and reception

Box office

The Texas Chainsaw Massacre was released in North America on October 17, 2003, in 3,016 theaters. It grossed $10,620,000 on its opening day and concluded its opening weekend with $29.1 million, debuting at number 1 at the U.S. box office. Within 17 days of its release, the film had grossed over $66 million in the US.

The film opened in various other countries in the following months (including a Halloween release in the United Kingdom) and grossed $26.5 million, while the North American gross stands at $80.6 million, bringing the worldwide gross to $107 million. The film's budget was $9.5 million, making it the highest-grossing film of the franchise even when adjusted for inflation. Adjusted for inflation as of 2018 the film would have grossed over $162 million.

Critical response
Review aggregator Rotten Tomatoes shows an approval rating of 37% based on 156 reviews; the average rating is 4.87/10. The consensus is: "An unnecessary remake that's more gory and less scary than the original." Metacritic, another review aggregator, calculates an average of 38%, indicating "generally unfavorable reviews". Audiences polled by CinemaScore gave the film an average grade of "B+" on an A+ to F scale.

Manohla Dargis of the Los Angeles Times praised the polish of Pearl's cinematography (in contrast to his grittier work in the original), though noted: "The remake moves faster and sounds louder, but comes off as callous rather than creepy." Robert K. Elder of the Chicago Tribune gave it three out of four stars and called it "an effectively scary slasher film" despite its absurd premise. William Thomas of Empire rated it three stars out of five and wrote: "You'll have to overcome resentment towards this unnecessary remake before you can be properly terrorised but, on its own terms, it plays well." Roger Ebert gave the film a rare zero stars out of four, calling it "A contemptible film: Vile, ugly and brutal. There is not a shred of reason to see it. Those who defend it will have to dance through mental hoops of their own devising, defining its meanness and despair as 'style' or 'vision' or 'a commentary on our world'." Variety gave the film an unfavorable review, writing that the film was an "initially promising, but quickly disappointing retread of a hugely influential horror classic".

Peter Travers of Rolling Stone awarded the film two stars out of four, writing: "Director Marcus Nispel, acclaimed for his ads and music videos, has a sharp eye and the good sense to hire Daniel Pearl, who shot the first Chainsaw. But all the bad-rehash mojo from Friday the 13th to The Blair Witch Project has infected Scott Kosar's script. Hooper went for primitive, Nispel goes for slick. Hooper went easy on the gore, Nispel pours it on" and called the film "soulless". Dave Kehr from The New York Times gave the film an unfavorable review, noting: "Rather than exhilaration, this bilious film offers only entrapment and despair," further commenting that the film was about as much fun as sitting in on an autopsy. Leonard Maltin awarded the film 1.5 stars out of four, complimenting the film's intensity but criticized the lack of likable characters and the lack of humor which was present in the original, stating, "Once it kicks into gear, it's brutally unrelenting toward its unappealing characters and the audience."

On SBS' The Movie Show Australian critic Margaret Pomeranz said this was the first film she has walked out of (giving it half an hour) and declined it a rating while fellow host David Statton rated it one star.  “I was in a cinema and there was about 10 single men sitting around, and I just thought, I don’t have to see this,” she says.  “So yes, I did walk out. I choose to embrace movies, but there is a lot of average movies out there. You just have to try and look at the good things in them.  “Certain genres are not to my taste — prison dramas, man's cruelty to other men or women … I used to embrace violence in cinema in a lot of ways, but I’m reacting against that.

The BBC's Jamie Russell gave the film some praise, referring to it as "a gory, stylish, and occasionally scary push-button factory of shocks and shrieks remarkably better than anyone had the right to expect." but goes on to lament, "if the filmmakers could churn out something this decent, why didn't they shoot an original script, or even a sequel to Hooper's 1974 classic instead of a remake?" The Guardians Peter Bradshaw awarded the film two stars out of five, referring to it as a "bullish revival" of the original, adding: "The movie finds tastily grotesque Diane Arbus locals to freak out our poor heroes and heroines. Everything is as unsubtle as you like, and let's face it, unsubtlety is the order of the day."

Legacy 
Due to the film's financial success, it influenced a plethora of horror movie franchises to remake their original films across the span of the 2000's and 2010's. Notable examples include House of Wax, The Wicker Man, The Omen, Halloween, My Bloody Valentine 3D, Friday the 13th, and A Nightmare on Elm Street. These were met with negative to mixed reviews and have been heavily criticized by audiences and critics alike for being unnecessary additions to their franchises.

Home media

The film was released on VHS and DVD March 30, 2004, through New Line Home Entertainment. Special features include seven TV spots, a soundtrack promo  and trailers and a music video for Suffocate by Motograter.
A two-disc Platinum Series Edition was also released that same day, containing a collectible metal plaque cover, three filmmaker commentaries with producer Michael Bay, director Marcus Nispel and others, crime city photo cards, deleted scenes, an alternate opening and ending, Chainsaw Redux: In-Depth documentary, Gein: The Ghoul of Planifield documentary, cast screen tests, art gallery, seven TV spots and trailers, heavy metal song Suffocate by "Motograter" Music Video, a soundtrack promo and DVD-ROM content, including script-to-screen

A UMD version of the film was released on October 4, 2005, and on Blu-ray on September 29, 2009.

Novelization
Stephen Hand wrote a novelization that was published March 1, 2004, by Black Flame. Hand previously wrote the novelization for Freddy vs. Jason, also for New Line and Black Flame.

Music

There were two soundtrack albums released by Bulletproof Records/La-La Land Records for the film; the first was meant for regular audiences featuring popular metal music and was released on November 4, 2003.

The second was the film's original score as composed by Steve Jablonsky. This was released on October 21, 2003, and has a run time of 50:25.

Trailers and TV spots used a version of This Mortal Coil's cover of "Song to the Siren", which was just recorded for the trailer and was sung by the singer Renee of the band Moneypenny.

Soundtrack
 "Immortally Insane" by Pantera
 "Below the Bottom" by Hatebreed
 "Pride" by SOiL
 "Deliver Me" by Static-X
 "43" by Mushroomhead
 "Pig" by Seether
 "Down In Flames" by Nothingface
 "Self-Medicate" by 40 Below Summer
 "Suffocate" by Motograter
 "Destroyer of Senses" by Shadows Fall
 "Rational Gaze" by Meshuggah
 "Archetype (Remix)" by Fear Factory
 "Enshrined by Grace" by Morbid Angel
 "Listen" by Index Case
 "Stay in Shadow" by Finger Eleven
 "Ruin" by Lamb of God
 "As Real As It Gets" by Sworn Enemy
 "Five Months" by Coretez

Notelist

References

Bibliography

External links

 

2003 horror films
2003 films
Remakes of American films
2000s English-language films
The Texas Chainsaw Massacre (franchise) films
2003 directorial debut films
Films produced by Kim Henkel
Films set in 1973
Films set in Texas
Films shot in Austin, Texas
Horror film remakes
Reboot films
American serial killer films
Platinum Dunes films
Films scored by Steve Jablonsky
Films directed by Marcus Nispel
Films produced by Michael Bay
2000s American films